Darija Jurak and Megan Moulton-Levy were the defending champions, but chose not to participate this year.

Seeds

Draw

Draw

References
 Main Draw

Monterrey Open - Doubles
2015 Doubles